The following is a comprehensive discography of Hybrid, a British electronic music group. Their discography comprises four studio albums, five compilation albums, six soundtrack albums, three EPs, eighteen singles, and several other releases.

Albums

Studio albums

Compilation albums

Soundtrack albums

EPs

Singles

Promotional releases

Albums
 The Remix Collection (1996)
 Music from the Forthcoming Album Wide Angle (1998)
 Views from Wide Angle (1999)
 Scores (2005)

Singles
 "Symphony" (1996)
 "Visible Noise" / "Know Your Enemy" (2002)
 "Gravastar" / "Celebrity Science" (2002)

Remixes

Hybrid has produced over 100 remixes of more than 40 artists, including Radiohead, Alanis Morissette, U2, Filter, BT, DJ Rap, The Orb, Jean Michel Jarre, Gouryella, The Future Sound of London, UNKLE, Moby and The Crystal Method.

Music videos

References

External links
 www.hybridband.com official site 1
 hybridscores.com official site 2

Discographies of British artists
Electronic music discographies